CFQ is an acronym that may refer to:

 Completely fair queueing, an I/O scheduler for the Linux kernel.
Cinefantastique, a science fiction / fantasy magazine renamed CFQ
 Creston Aerodrome, (IATA code), Canada
 Cognitive Failures Questionnaire, in neuroticism